Hephaestus makes many appearances in popular culture.

Hephaestus appears in W H Auden's poem "The Shield of Achilles"
Hephaestus participates in a story science fiction duology Ilium/Olympos by Dan Simmons.
Hephaestus appears briefly in the Clash of the Titans, portrayed by British wrestler and actor Pat Roach.
Hephaestus plays a role in the 2010 video game God of War III and is voiced by actor Rip Torn; he assists protagonist Kratos by providing him with new weapons, the electrically based Nemesis Whip, but betrays Kratos and in turn is killed by him in an attempt to keep him away from his created daughter Pandora. He also created the weapon, the Gauntlet of Zeus, that appears in the 2008 video game God of War: Chains of Olympus. In the God of War novel (2010), it is revealed that he created Kratos' Blades of Chaos in Tartarus (the original video game only said that Ares had them forged in Tartarus but did not state who forged them).
In Diablo II, the player has to kill Hephasto the Armorer in order to complete a quest.
Hephaestus appears in several episodes of the TV series Hercules: The Legendary Journeys, Young Hercules and Xena: Warrior Princess. He is portrayed by the actors Julian Garner and Jason Hoyte.
Hephaestus appears in the Pastoral Symphony segment of the 1940 Disney film Fantasia. He is shown forging thunderbolts for Zeus to throw at Dionysus. However, while Zeus kept his Greek name, the animators referred to Hephaestus and Dionysus by their Roman names, Vulcan and Bacchus.
Hephaestus appeared in the 1997 Disney movie, Hercules and the animated series based on it, as one of the gods upon Mount Olympus and the brother of Hercules. He is shown to be engaged to Aphrodite and hates it when Hades flirts with her.
Hephaestus appears in Justice League Unlimited voiced by Ed Asner.
Hephaestus appears in the fourth book in the Percy Jackson and the Olympians series, The Battle of the Labyrinth and in the Heroes of Olympus series, "The Lost Hero" as the father of Leo Valdez. In these series, his workshop is shown to have moved from Mount Aetna to Mount St. Helens.
 In John C. Wright's Titans of Chaos, Hephaestus (Mulciber) is one of the powerful gods who attends the conference on what to do with the children; he offers Amelia a job as part of their plan to split the children up.
 In the 2000-2004 Andromeda (TV series), the Battle of Hephaistos was the opening battle in First Systems Commonwealth Civil War against the Systems Commonwealth. The spaceship Andromeda Ascendant ended up trapped on the edge of the Event Horizon of a black hole for over 300 years. These events formed the basis of many events portrayed throughout the series.
 Vulcan appears in The Apotheosis of Washington, producing a cannon and a steam engine.
 Vulcan (at his forge in Mount Etna) was visited by German adventurer Baron Munchausen in the stories of Rudolph Erich Raspe. This story was featured in the 1988 film The Adventures of Baron Munchausen by Terry Gilliam, with Oliver Reed as Vulcan.
 In the 2012 film Wrath of the Titans, Hephaestus is played by Bill Nighy. He is, in the film, credited with the creation of Tartarus and the forging of the weapons of the gods.
 In Homestuck Hephaestus is the denizen, a sort of final boss, in Land of Heat and Clockwork.
 In the video game Smite Hephaestus appears in-game under his Roman name Vulcan, he is a playable god whose role is a mage. He also has a prosthetic left leg and right hand, in reference to both his lameness from mythology and his own ingenuity and peerless craftsmanship.
 In David Weber's Honorverse, Hephaestus is the name of the Star Kingdom of Manticore's primary orbital warship construction and repair platform.
 In its 2013 Expansion (based on Greek and Roman Mythology) entitled Theros, Magic, The Gathering paralleled Hephaestus with the creature card "Purphoros, God of the Forge" mimicking his hammer as well.
 Hephaestus is a main character in the novel The Automation by the anonymous author "B.L.A. and G.B. Gabbler." The other characters also call him Vulcan on occasion.
 Hephaestus is an important god in the light novel Is It Wrong to Try to Pick Up Girls in a Dungeon? and is the leader of the smith familia. This incarnation has been gender swapped.
 Hephaestus, as Vulcan, appears on episode 6 in the first season of the American Gods played by Corbin Bernsen.
 In the 2017 role playing game Horizon Zero Dawn Hephaestus is the name given to one of the AIs used to terraform a future Earth. It is responsible for the creation of robots and machines. It also serves as a minor antagonist.
 Champ in Uchu Sentai Kyuranger is based on Hephaestus due to him being made of metal.
 In 2018, the band Warkings released a song called Hephaistos on their debut album Reborn. The song is about the god Hephaestos.
 Hephaestus is mentioned in Ubisoft‘s ancient Greek themed video game Assassin's Creed Odyssey.
Hephaestus appears in the mobile game app Tokyo Afterschool Summoners as member of Kamata Crafters' Guild, appearing officially at Chapter 9 along with his creation and Sacred Artifact, the automata Talos
 Hephaestus is a major character in Ubisoft's Greek Mythology themed video game Immortals Fenyx Rising.
 Hephaestus is depicted in an art piece in 2021 'Hephaestus At Work'. This digital art nft was created by artificial intelligence and sold at auction on the Binance marketplace.
 Hephaestos is the inspiration for the Eternal (comics) Phastos who is a blacksmith. His newest appearance is in the Eternals (film)
 In the audio drama Wolf 359, the U.S.S. Hephaestus is a space station run by an artificially intelligent "mother program" named Hera.

References

Classical mythology in popular culture
Popular culture
Greek and Roman deities in fiction